The Minnesota Senate, District 38, encompasses portions of Anoka and Ramsey counties in the northern Twin Cities metropolitan area.  It has formerly included Cottonwood, Jackson,  Martin, Murray, Nobles, Pipestone, Rock, Watonwan, Chisago, Kanabec, Pine, and Dakota counties. Since January 2023, the district is represented by Heather Gustafson, a Democrat who defeated the long-term incumbent, Roger Chamberlain.

District profile
The district stretches along the southern edge of Anoka, Ramsey, and Washington counties.

Due to redistricting, the 38th district has been moved around various counties in the southern part of the state.  Redistricting by the Minnesota State Legislature became effective in 2012; after the 2020 census, the district was again redrawn.

2010

Part of Anoka County
Blaine
Centerville
Circle Pines
Lexington
Lino Lakes

Part of Ramsey County
North Oaks
White Bear Lake
White Bear Township

Part of Washington County
Hugo
Dellwood

, the population of the 38th district was split 49.8% male and 50.2% female, with 49.3% of men and 50.7% of women being eligible to vote.  96.2% of residents were at least a high school graduate (or equivalent), and 40.2% had earned a bachelor's degree or higher.  35.8% of the population is of German ancestry, the largest ethnic group in the district, followed by Norwegian descent at 14.3%.  The unemployment rate was at 3.3%.

List of senators

Recent elections

2016
The candidate filing deadline was May 31, 2016, and the primary election took place on August 9, 2016, with both candidates running unopposed.  The general election was held on November 8, 2016, and Republican incumbent Roger Chamberlain defeated Democratic candidate Patrick Davern.

2012
The signature filing deadline for candidates wishing to run in the 2012 elections on June 5, 2012.  The primary election was held on August 14, 2012, with neither candidate facing party opposition.  The general election was held on November 6, 2012. Republican incumbent Roger Chamberlain defeated Democratic challenger Timothy Henderson.

References 

Minnesota Senate districts